Sciaphilus is a genus of beetles belonging to the family Curculionidae.

The species of this genus are found in Europe and Northern America.

Species:
 Sciaphilus asperatus (Bonsdorff, 1785) 
 Sciaphilus costulatus Kiesenwetter, 1852

References

Curculionidae
Curculionidae genera